The Gladstone–Dale relation is a mathematical relation used for optical analysis of liquids, the determination of composition from optical measurements. It can also be used to calculate the density of a liquid for use in fluid dynamics (e.g., flow visualization). The relation has also been used to calculate refractive index of glass and minerals in optical mineralogy.

Uses 
In the Gladstone–Dale relation, the index of refraction (n) or the density (ρ in g/cm3) of miscible liquids that are mixed in mass fraction (m) can be calculated from characteristic optical constants (the molar refractivity k in cm3/g) of pure molecular end-members. For example, for any mass (m) of ethanol added to a mass of water, the alcohol content is determined by measuring density or index of refraction (Brix refractometer). Mass (m) per unit volume (V) is the density m/V. Mass is conserved on mixing, but the volume of 1 cm3 of ethanol mixed with 1 cm3 of water is reduced to less than 2 cm3 due to the formation of ethanol-water bonds. The plot of volume or density versus molecular fraction of ethanol in water is a quadratic curve. However, the plot of index of refraction versus molecular fraction of ethanol in water is linear, and the weight fraction equals the fractional density

In the 1900s, the Gladstone–Dale relation was applied to glass, synthetic crystals and minerals. Average values for the refractivity of oxides such as MgO or SiO2 give good to excellent agreement between the calculated and measured average indices of refraction of minerals. However, specific values of refractivity are required to deal with different structure-types, and the relation required modification to deal with structural polymorphs and the birefringence of anisotropic crystal structures.

In recent optical crystallography, Gladstone–Dale constants for the refractivity of ions were related to the inter-ionic distances and angles of the crystal structure. The ionic refractivity depends on 1/d2, where d is the inter-ionic distance, indicating that a particle-like photon refracts locally due to the electrostatic Coulomb force between ions.

Expression 

where n is the index of refraction, D = density and constant = Gladstone-Dale constant.

The macroscopic values (n) and (V) determined on bulk material are now calculated as a sum of atomic or molecular properties. Each molecule has a characteristic mass (due to the atomic weights of the elements) and atomic or molecular volume that contributes to the bulk density, and a characteristic refractivity due to a characteristic electric structure that contributes to the net index of refraction.

The refractivity of a single molecule is the refractive volume k(MW)/NA in nm3, where MW is the molecular weight and NA is the Avogadro constant. To calculate the optical properties of materials using the polarizability or refractivity volumes in nm3, the Gladstone–Dale relation competes with the Kramers–Kronig relation and Lorentz–Lorenz relation but differs in optical theory.

The index of refraction (n) is calculated from the change of angle of a collimated monochromatic beam of light from vacuum into liquid using Snell's law for refraction. Using the theory of light as an electromagnetic wave, light takes a straight-line path through water at reduced speed (v) and wavelength (λ).

The Gladstone–Dale term  is the non-linear optical path length or time delay. Using Isaac Newton's theory of light as a stream of particles refracted locally by (electric) forces acting between atoms, the optic path length is due to refraction at constant speed by displacement about each atom. As the speed of light is a ratio (distance per unit time in m/s), light also took an extra 0.33 s to travel through water compared to light traveling 1 s in vacuum.

Compatibility index 
Mandarino, in his review of the Gladstone–Dale relationship in minerals proposed the concept of the Compatibility Index in comparing the physical and optical properties of minerals. This compatibility index is a required calculation for approval as a new mineral species (see IMA guidelines).

The compatibility index (CI) is defined as follows:

Where, KP = Gladstone-Dale Constant derived from physical properties.

Requirements 
The Gladstone–Dale relation requires a particle model of light because the continuous wave-front required by wave theory cannot be maintained if light encounters atoms or molecules that maintain a local electric structure with a characteristic refractivity. Similarly, the wave theory cannot explain the photoelectric effect or absorption by individual atoms and one requires a local particle of light (see Wave–particle duality).

A local model of light consistent with these electrostatic refraction calculations occurs if the electromagnetic energy is restricted to a finite region of space. An electric-charge monopole must occur perpendicular to dipole loops of magnetic flux, but if local mechanisms for propagation are required, a periodic oscillatory exchange of electromagnetic energy occurs with transient mass. In the same manner, a change of mass occurs as an electron binds to a proton. This local photon has zero rest mass and no net charge, but has wave properties with spin-1 symmetry on trace over time. In this modern version of Newton's corpuscular theory of light, the local photon acts as a probe of the molecular or crystal structure.

References

Fluid dynamics
Optics